Rita Tamašauskaitė (born 22 June 1941) is a retired Lithuanian rower who won three European titles in the eights event in 1963, 1965 and 1967; she finished second in 1966. In 1962 Tamašauskaitė graduated from the Lithuanian Sports University and later worked as a rowing referee.

References

1941 births
Living people
Lithuanian female rowers
Soviet female rowers
European Rowing Championships medalists